Bodega Ridge Provincial Park is a provincial park in British Columbia, Canada.  It is on Galiano Island, which lies between Vancouver and Vancouver Island, and comprises . The park's high cliffs are home to bald eagles, peregrine falcons, and turkey vultures.

The park was preserved as a result of a long fund-raising campaign from 1991 to 1995, which eventually gained the support of the Nature Conservancy of Canada. In recent years it has received donations from adjacent landowners, and has nearly doubled in size.

External links

– Souvenir of the preservation campaign, 1993.
Another preservation campaign PSA with Margaret Atwood & Graeme Gibson (bad audio)
Official website

Provincial parks of British Columbia
Galiano Island
2001 establishments in British Columbia